Medan Jaya or Penajam Medan Jaya (2008–09) or Medina Medan Jaya (2010-now) is an  Indonesian football club based in Medan, North Sumatra. They play in Liga 3.

Their home ground is Teladan Stadium.

History 
Medan Jaya was established in 1987 and has become a well-respected club in the era of competition Galatama as well as the Premier Division competition. But the achievements of this team started to decline in 2000. In season 1999/2000, Medan Jaya was relegated to the First Division and thrown back to the Second Division in season 2004. Medan Jaya re-tread into First Division competition started the 2006 season.

Name
 Penajam Medan Jaya (2008–2009;  incorporating the name of the owner of the majority stake)
 Medina Medan Jaya (2010-now; incorporating the name of the owner of the majority stake)

References

External links
Medina Medan Jaya at Liga-Indonesia.co.id

 
Football clubs in Indonesia
Football clubs in North Sumatra
Association football clubs established in 1987
1987 establishments in Indonesia